Bittersweet Harmony is a 2003 album by Skydiggers. It was their first album of new material since 1997's Desmond's Hip City. (Still Restless: The Lost Tapes, released in 1999, was a release of older material.)

A limited edition advance version of the album was released in 2002. That version had a different cover and did not include the track "All of Our Dreaming".

Track listing
All tracks written by Finlayson/Maize unless otherwise noted.
 "Anything for You"
 "Kings"
 "Fall Apart"
 "Horseshoe Bay"
 "Elizabeth Josephine"
 "Jane's Gone"
 "Sweet Heartache"
 "California"
 "See You Again" (Macleod)
 "Wherever You Go"
 "Back Out on the Road"
 "All of Our Dreaming"
 "Just Love Again"
 "Everybody's Girl"

2003 albums
Skydiggers albums
MapleMusic Recordings albums